The tepui tinamou (Crypturellus ptaritepui) is a type of ground bird found in montane moist forest on tepuis, in southeastern Venezuela.

Taxonomy
This is a monotypic species. All tinamou are from the family Tinamidae, and in the larger scheme are also ratites.  Unlike other ratites, tinamous can fly, although in general, they are not strong fliers.  All ratites evolved from prehistoric flying birds, and tinamous are the closest living relative of these birds.

Etymology
Thus, Crypturellus means ‘little hidden tail’.

Description
The top of its head and rear of neck are rufous brown, darker on its back, and dusky below with rufous sheen on its upper breast. The sides of its head and throat are grey in color, its upper mandible is black, its lower mandible yellow with black tip, and its legs are olive in color.

Behavior
Like other tinamous, the tepui eats fruit off the ground or low-lying bushes.  They also eat small amounts of invertebrates, flower buds, tender leaves, seeds, and roots. The male incubates the eggs which may come from as many as 4 different females, and then will raise them until they are ready to be on their own, usually 2–3 weeks. The nest is located on the ground in dense brush or between raised root buttresses.

Range and habitat
The tepui tinamou has been found on Ptari-tepuí, Auyán-tepuí, Chimantá-tepuí, and Sororopán-tepuí, in southeastern Bolívar, Venezuela.

Conservation
It is a protected species in Venezuela.

Footnotes

References
 
 
 
 
 

Crypturellus
Tinamous of South America
Birds of the Tepuis
Birds described in 1945
Taxa named by John T. Zimmer